Tallangatta is a closed station located in the town of Tallangatta, on the Cudgewa railway line in Victoria, Australia. Today the station is privately owned.

The turntable at Tallangatta was abolished in 1976.

References

Disused railway stations in Victoria (Australia)
Railway stations in Australia opened in 1891
Railway stations closed in 1981
1981 disestablishments in Australia
Shire of Towong